Sukun is a district (kecamatan) in Malang, East Java, Indonesia.  Bentoel Group, one of oldest and most famous Indonesian tobacco company based in the district.

Subdistricts
There are 11 subdistricts (kelurahan) in Sukun:

Bandulan, postal code 65146
Karangbesuki, postal code 65146
Pisangcandi, postal code 65146
Mulyorejo, postal code 65147
Sukun, postal code 65147
Tanjungrejo, postal code 65147
Bakalankrajan, postal code 65148
Bandungrejosari, postal code 65148
Ciptomulyo, postal code 65148
Gadang, postal code 65149
Kebonsari, postal code 65149

Geography

Climate
The climate in Sukun features tropical monsoon climate (Am) according to Köppen–Geiger climate classification system, as the climate precipitation throughout the year is greatly influenced by the monsoon, bordering with subtropical highland climate (Cwb). Most months of the year are marked by significant rainfall. The short dry season has little impact. The average temperature in Sukun is 23.7 °C. In a year, the average rainfall is 2079 mm.

See also 

 Districts of East Java
 List of districts of Indonesia

References

External links 
 Official website of Kecamatan Sukun

Districts of East Java
Malang